Støv på hjernen is a 1959 Norwegian comedy film directed by Øyvind Vennerød and starring Inger Marie Andersen and Odd Borg. It was based on a novel by Eva Ramm, and shot on location in Lambertseter.

The film's title translates into "dust on the brain" and the story centers around the busybody housewives of a modern Norwegian working-class neighbourhood of the 1950s. It became an immediate smash hit, was seen by 1.5 million people in Norwegian cinemas, making it one of the most successful Norwegian movies in history (the population of Norway at the time was under 4 million). It has since been repeated often on television. It was followed by two sequels, Sønner av Norge (1961) and Sønner av Norge kjøper bil (1962), and remade in Denmark as Støv på hjernen.

Cast
 Inger Marie Andersen as Randi Svendsen
 Odd Borg as Gunnar Svendsen
 Kari Diesen as Fru Hansen
 Willie Hoel as Herr Hansen
 Lalla Carlsen as Fru Svenkerud
 Unni Bernhoft as Fru Sørensen
 Wenche Foss as Edna Grindheim
 Per Theodor Haugen as Herr Sørensen
 Sverre Holm as Ole Berg
 Liv Wilse as Bitten Helgesen
 Turid Balke as En husmor
 Arne Bang-Hansen

External links

1959 films
Norwegian comedy films
1950s Norwegian-language films
Films directed by Øyvind Vennerød